KOMC-FM (100.1 MHz) is a radio station airing an adult contemporary format licensed to Kimberling City, Missouri. The station serves the areas of Branson, Missouri, Harrison, Arkansas, and Berryville, Arkansas, and is owned by Paul Coates and Mike Huckabee, through licensee Ozark Mountain Media Group, LLC.

KOMC was originally owned by Turtle Broadcasting Company of Branson, a subsidiary of Orr & Earls Broadcasting, Inc.  It was added to the lineup of stations originally purchased in 1986.  They include KOMC-AM and KRZK-FM which were off the air at the time.  Co-principal Roderick Orr sold his interest in the company to Charles Earls in 2004. Earls Broadcasting sold the station to Ozark Mountain Media Group effective December 10, 2018.

References

External links

Mainstream adult contemporary radio stations in the United States
OMC-FM